Marc Francina (2 February 1948 in Évian-les-Bains – 26 October 2018) was a member of the National Assembly of France.  He represented the Haute-Savoie department,  and was a member of the Union for a Popular Movement.
Prior to his political career Francina worked as a bank clerk for a regional bank.

References 

1948 births
2018 deaths
People from Évian-les-Bains
Union for a Popular Movement politicians
Deputies of the 13th National Assembly of the French Fifth Republic
Deputies of the 14th National Assembly of the French Fifth Republic